Vernon D. Acree (June 25, 1919 – February 1, 2013) was an American administrator who served as Commissioner of the United States Customs Service from 1972 to 1977. He served in the United States Army during World War II.

He died of pneumonia on February 1, 2013, in Fairfax, Virginia at age 93.

References

1919 births
2013 deaths
United States Army personnel of World War II
Commissioners of the United States Customs Service